High Jinks in Society is a 1949 British comedy film directed by John Guillermin and Robert Jordan Hill and starring Ben Wrigley, Barbara Shaw, Basil Appleby, Peter Gawthorne and Moore Marriott.

Plot
After foiling a robbery, a window cleaner is hired by an aristocrat to protect their valuables with comic results.

Cast
 Ben Wrigley as Ben
 Barbara Shaw as Angela
 Moore Marriott as Grandpa
 Basil Appleby as Hector
 Netta Westcott as Lady Barr-Nunn
 Michael Ward as Watkins
 Peter Gawthorne as Jenkins

Production
It was an early film credit for John Guillermin.

References

External links

Hijinks in Society at BFI
Hijinks in Society at Letterbox DVD

Films directed by John Guillermin
1949 films
1949 comedy films
British comedy films
British black-and-white films
1949 directorial debut films
1940s English-language films
1940s British films